Brendan Richard Joseland (born 2 April 1976 in Ferntree Gully, Victoria) is a cricket player for the Victorian Bushrangers.

He plays in the Victorian Premier Cricket league for the University of Melbourne, and has played for Victoria in both the Pura Cup and the ING Cup.

Cricket career 
Joseland made his List-A cricket debut in January 2003 against the Queensland Bulls.  After playing two more ING Cup matches that season and four more at the start of the 2003/04 season, he had to wait until March 2004 to make his first-class cricket debut in the Pura Cup. He opened the batting and again compiled a 50 in the first innings, however, he would again be forced out of the side. He would remain on the outer for the rest of the season. Despite this disappointment the resilient Joseland continued to perform well as captain of Melbourne University. Scoring 782 runs at an average 52.13 throughout the season. Joseland further restated his all-rounder capabilities by taking 14 wickets for the season.

2005/06 season
In the 2005–06 Australian cricket season, Joseland became captain of the Victorian 2nd XI and in the wake of departures from the likes of Matthew Elliott and Ian Harvey, the door was open for Joseland to make a return. However, Lloyd Mash, fellow opener with the 2nd XI, scored 233 in September 2005, which saw him later make his debut for Victoria's seniors.

Meanwhile, Joseland struggled in the district competition and it was not till Round 8 where he scored a 57, and soon after, an unbeaten 90, that he finally hit form (he declared just short of what would have been his maiden century). His first century came soon after for the Victorian 2nd XI, where he made 103* against the ACT, and another one followed for Melbourne Uni against Ringwood.

Joseland was not included in the Victorian 2nd XI's final match of the season despite his good form and the fact that he held the captaincy.

2006/07 season
Joseland's contract with the Bushranger's was not renewed for the 2006/07 season, a fact he was braced for by the end of the 05/06 district season. 05/06 was to be Joseland's last season with the University of Melbourne as he was replaced as captain and is no longer with the club or playing at a district level in Victoria.

References

External links 
Bushrangers Profile

1976 births
Living people
Australian cricketers
Victoria cricketers
Cricketers from Melbourne
People from Ferntree Gully, Victoria